Joe McAndrew is an American politician. A Democrat, he is currently a member of the Pennsylvania House of Representatives, representing the 32nd district. He was elected in a 2023 special election to succeed Tony DeLuca, who died on October 9, 2022.

Electoral history

References

External links

21st-century American politicians
Democratic Party members of the Pennsylvania House of Representatives
Living people
1990 births
People from Penn Hills Township, Allegheny County, Pennsylvania